The republics in the Commonwealth of Nations are the sovereign states in the organisation with a republican form of government. , 36 out of the 56 member states were republics. While Charles III is the titular Head of the Commonwealth, the King is not the head of state of the republican members. The King is however, the reigning monarch in the Commonwealth realms. The Head of the Commonwealth role does not carry with it any power; instead, it is a symbol of the free association of Commonwealth members.

Except for the former Portuguese possession of Mozambique, the former Belgian trust territory of Rwanda and the former French possessions of Gabon and Togo, they are all former British (or partly British) colonies or self-governing colonies that have evolved into republics. Most of the Commonwealth's members achieved independence while keeping the British monarch as their own individual head of state (in a form of personal union) and later became republics within the Commonwealth by abolishing the monarchy. In some other instances, the countries became republics after achieving independence from other former British colonies (as, for example, Bangladesh did from Pakistan in 1971 as a result of the Bangladesh Liberation War).

History
Republics have been permitted as members of the Commonwealth since the London Declaration made on 28 April 1949. Ten days before that declaration, the Republic of Ireland had been declared, ensuring most of Ireland's self-exclusion from the Commonwealth, as republics were not allowed in the Commonwealth at that time (Northern Ireland, as part of the United Kingdom, remained within the Commonwealth). The Republic of Ireland did not re-apply for membership of the Commonwealth, despite being eligible to do so under the London Declaration.

The declaration was made by India to allow it to continue its membership of the Commonwealth despite its decision, implemented on 26 January 1950, to adopt a new Constitution and become a republic, abolishing the monarchy. Thus, India became the first republic within the Commonwealth. This set a precedent that all other countries were free to follow, as long as they each recognised the position of Head of the Commonwealth. A compromise between the Indian government and those, such as Jan Smuts, who wished not to allow republics membership, the Declaration read:

Following their independence from the United Kingdom, most Commonwealth countries retained Queen Elizabeth II as head of state, who was represented in the country by a Governor-General. The monarch adopted a title to indicate the individual sovereignty of each of these nations (such as "Queen of Belize"). With time, many of these countries became republics, passing constitutional amendments or holding referendums to remove the monarch as their head of state, and replacing the governor-general with an elected or appointed president. This was especially true in post-colonial Africa. Most African realms became republics within a few years of independence. As of 2022, there are 15 states headed by King  Charles III, which are known as Commonwealth realms.

Commonwealth republics usually followed the presidential system. Some states became parliamentary republics, such as Malta or Fiji. In Fiji, the change to a republic in 1987 came as a result of two military coups, rather than out of any popular republican sentiment.

Even when Fiji was not a member of the Commonwealth, symbols of the monarchy remained, including the Queen's portrait on banknotes and coins; and, unlike in the United Kingdom, the Queen's Official Birthday is a public holiday. When Fiji was readmitted to the Commonwealth, the issue of reinstating the Queen as head of state was raised, but not pursued, although the country's Great Council of Chiefs reaffirmed that the Queen was still the country's "Paramount Chief".

Some republics within the Commonwealth became republics on gaining independence from the United Kingdom; again, this was particularly true in Africa.

While the moves to both independence and republican status have broken the remaining constitutional links to the United Kingdom, a number of Commonwealth countries have retained a right of appeal directly to the Judicial Committee of the Privy Council; for example, Mauritius, and (if the case involves constitutional rights) Kiribati. In contrast with Commonwealth realms and British Overseas Territories, however, such appeals are made directly to the Judicial Committee, rather than formally being made to "His Majesty in Council".

Commonwealth membership

Within the Commonwealth, there is no differentiation in status between republics, Commonwealth realms and the members with their own monarchs (Brunei, Eswatini, Lesotho, Malaysia, and Tonga).

Membership of the Commonwealth is by common assent of the existing members, and this principle applies equally to territories gaining independence from the UK and to outside territories requesting membership. Until 2007, Commonwealth members that changed their internal constitutional structure to that of a republic had to re-apply for membership. Widespread objection to the racial policies in South Africa resulted in that country deciding not to pursue a re-application for Commonwealth membership when it became a republic in 1961. South Africa was subsequently readmitted as a member of the Commonwealth after democratic elections in 1994. Fiji and the Maldives also did not apply for continued membership after becoming republics (Fiji was likely to be suspended in any case, since a coup had overthrown the democratically elected government), and thus their membership lapsed too.

Current republics in the Commonwealth
In some countries that became republics some time after independence, including Malta, Mauritius, and Trinidad and Tobago, the new office of president was a ceremonial post, usually held by the last governor-general, each respective country being a parliamentary republic. In others, such as Gambia, Ghana, and Malawi, the presidency was an executive post, usually first held by the last prime minister, with each respective country being a presidential republic. In the latter cases, not only was the monarchy abolished, but so was the entire Westminster system of parliamentary government as well.

List of republics

Republics since independence

In each case, the republic was created through a new constitution.

Other republics in the Commonwealth

Republics formerly in the Commonwealth

Currently, the only former Commonwealth republics are:
 , also known as the Republic of Ireland, is a republic and a former member of the Commonwealth; however, it does not fit neatly into a category as such. In 1922, as the Irish Free State, it became a dominion in the British Commonwealth. In 1937, the present-day Irish state, officially called Ireland, was established. Its Constitution established it as a de facto republic with little reference to a monarchy but equally no reference to a republic either (see Irish head of state from 1936 to 1949 for further discussion on this ambiguity). 
 , a republic since 18 April 1980, left the Commonwealth in December 2003. In 2018, the government of Emmerson Mnangagwa applied to rejoin the Commonwealth.

Eligibility of other republics to join the Commonwealth

The 2007 Kampala review of the Edinburgh Declaration delimits the nations eligible for admission to the Commonwealth to those with "a historic constitutional association with an existing Commonwealth member, save in exceptional circumstances". Various republics have a historic association with the United Kingdom as being former British-administrated territories. The 2009 admission of Rwanda, which has no such association, was made under the "exceptional circumstances" proviso. However, in 2022, Gabon and Togo, which were former French colonies, became new members of the Commonwealth.

The republics of South Sudan, Sudan, and Suriname have formally made applications, while other republics have expressed interest. Also, the application for observer status was submitted by the unrecognized state Somaliland, whose territory is officially considered as part of Somalia. The United States (Thirteen Colonies), Israel (Mandate for Palestine), Republic of Ireland (Irish Free State), and the Persian Gulf states, as former possessions of the British empire, are eligible for membership but have shown no interest.

See also
 List of republics
 Monarchy of Australia
 Monarchy of Canada
 Monarchy of New Zealand
 Monarchy of the United Kingdom

References